Thomas Henshaw may refer to:

Thomas Henshaw (alchemist) (1618–1700), English lawyer, courtier, diplomat and scientific writer
Thomas Henshaw (bishop) (1873–1938), Bishop of Salford
Thomas Henshaw (benefactor) (1731–1810), English hatter and school benefactor